A swivel, spinny, or revolving chair is a chair with a single central leg that allows the seat to rotate 360 degrees to the left or right. A concept of a rotating chair with swivel castors was illustrated by the Nuremberg patrician Martin Löffelholz von Kolberg in his 1505 technological illuminated manuscript, the so-called Codex Löffelholz, on folio 10r. It is purported that Thomas Jefferson drafted the United States Declaration of Independence in 1776 while sitting on a swivel chair of his own design.

Types and examples 
Swivel chairs may have wheels on the base allowing the user to move the chair around their work area without getting up. This type is common in modern offices and are often also referred to as office chairs. Office swivel chairs, like computer chairs, usually incorporate a gas lift to adjust the height of the seat, but not usually large (e.g. recliner) swiveling armchairs.

A draughtsman's chair is a swivel chair without wheels that is usually taller than an 'office chair' for use in front of a drawing board. They also have a foot-ring to support the legs when it is not possible to reach the ground.

Swivel seat 
When the swivel chair is installed in an aircraft, an automobile or on a stair lift and can not move independently because it is on a fixed base, it is rather called a swivel seat. Some swivel seats are also bucket seats.

Origin 

Using an English-style Windsor chair, possibly made by and purchased from Francis Trumble or Philadelphia cabinet-maker Benjamin Randolph, Thomas Jefferson constructed an early swivel chair.  Jefferson heavily modified the Windsor chair and incorporated top and bottom parts connected by a central iron spindle, enabling the top half known as the seat, to swivel on casters of the type used in rope-hung windows. It had no wheels. When the Second Continental Congress met in Philadelphia, Jefferson's swivel chair is purported to be the chair he sat upon when he drafted the United States Declaration of Independence in 1776. Jefferson later had the swivel chair sent to his Virginia plantation, Monticello, where he built a "writing paddle" onto its side in August 1791.

Since 1836, the chair has been in the possession of the American Philosophical Society located in Philadelphia.

See also
 Armrest
Bárány chair
Barber chair, another type of rotating chair
Folding seat
 Gaming chair

References

American inventions
Chairs
Works by Thomas Jefferson